Rongmook Ceder Tea Garden is a census town  in the Jorebunglow Sukhiapokhri CD block in the Darjeeling Sadar subdivision of the Darjeeling district in the state of West Bengal, India.

Geography

Location                                                   

Area overview
The map alongside shows a part of the southern portion of the Darjeeling Himalayan hill region  in the Darjeeling district. In the Darjeeling Sadar subdivision 61.00% of the total population lives in the rural areas and 39.00% of the population lives in the urban areas. In the Mirik subdivision 80.11% of the total population lives in the rural areas and 19.89% lives in the urban areas. There are 78 tea gardens/ estates (the figure varies slightly according to different sources), in the district, producing and largely exporting Darjeeling tea. It engages a large proportion of the population directly/ indirectly. Some tea gardens were identified in the 2011 census as census towns or villages. Such places are marked in the map as CT (census town) or R (rural/ urban centre). Specific tea estate pages are marked TE.

Note: The map alongside presents some of the notable locations in the subdivision. All places marked in the map are linked in the larger full screen map.

Demographics
According to the 2011 Census of India, Rongmook Ceder Tea Garden had a total population of 5,150 of which 2,528 (49%) were males and 2,622 (51%) were females. There were 423 persons in the age range of 0 to 6 years. The total number of literate people in Rongmook Ceder Tea Garden was 3,455 (67.09% of the population over 6 years).

Infrastructure
According to the District Census Handbook 2011, Darjiling, Rongmook Ceder Tea Garden covered an area of 7.1428 km2. Among the civic amenities, it had 8 km of roads with open drains, the protected water supply involved overhead tank and spring. It had 1,220 domestic electric connections. Among the educational facilities it had were 7 primary schools, 1 middle school, the nearest secondary and senior secondary schools at Pacherig Bazar 8 km away. It had 1 non-formal education centre (Sarva Siksha Abhiyan). An important commodity it manufactured was tea.

Rungmook Cedar Tea Estate
Rungmook tea estate and Cedar tea estate, both planted in the mid-1800s, were merged in the early 1900s.

Rungmook Cedar Tea Estate was subsequently taken over by Darjeeling Organic Tea Estates Private Ltd., a company formed by Bansal, with the objective of reviving closed and sick tea gardens. A large portion of the garden is forested.

DOTEPL group
The gardens of the Darjeeling Organic Tea Estates Private Ltd. are: Ambootia, Changtong, Happy Valley, Monteviot, Moondakotee, Mullootar, Nagri, Noorbong, Sepoydhurah (Chamling), Sivitar, Rangmook Ceder, Rangaroon, Pandam and Aloobari.

References

Cities and towns in Darjeeling district